Augusta may refer to:

Places

Australia
 Augusta, Western Australia

Brasil
  Rua Augusta (São Paulo)

Canada
 Augusta, Ontario
 North Augusta, Ontario
 Augusta Street (Hamilton, Ontario)

France
 Augusta Suessionum ("Augusta of the Suessii"), Soissons
 Augusta Viromanduorum ("Augusta of the Viromandui"), Saint-Quentin

Germany
 Augusta Treverorum ("Augusta of the Treveri") or Trier
 Augusta Vindelicorum ("Augusta of the Vindelici") or Augsburg

Italy
 Augusta, Sicily
 Augusta Praetoria Salassorum ("Praetorian Augusta of the Salassi") or Aosta
 Augusta Taurinorum ("Augusta of the Taurini") or Turin
 Perugia or Augusta Perusia

Spain
 Emerita Augusta, Mérida, Spain
 Caesar Augusta, Zaragoza, Spain

United States
 Augusta, Arkansas
 Augusta Charter Township, Michigan
 Augusta County, Virginia
 Augusta, Georgia
 Augusta National Golf Club ("Augusta"), home of the Masters Tournament
 Augusta, Illinois
 Augusta, Indiana
 Augusta, Indianapolis, Indiana
 Augusta, Kansas
 Augusta, Kentucky
 Augusta, Maine (capital city of Maine)
 Augusta, Michigan
 Augusta, Minnesota
 Augusta, Missouri
 Augusta AVA, a viticultural area
 Augusta, Montana
 Augusta, New Jersey
 Augusta, New York
 Augusta Township, Lac qui Parle County, Minnesota
 Augusta, West Virginia 
 Augusta, Wisconsin 
 Fort Augusta, Pennsylvania
 Mount Augusta, Alaska
 North Augusta, South Carolina
 Sipapu Bridge, Utah, formerly named as 'Augusta'

Elsewhere
 Augusta Euphratensis, Late Roman and Byzantine province in Syrian region
 Augusta Raurica ("Rauric Augusta"), Kaiseraugst (Augst), Switzerland
 Augusta Traiana ("Trajan Augusta"), Stara Zagora, Bulgaria
 Bracara Augusta, Braga, Portugal
 Isca Augusta ("Augustan Isca"), Caerleon, Wales
 Londinium (former name Augusta), London, England
 Lastovo (former name Augusta), a Croatian island
 Empress Augusta Bay, Bougainville Island

People
 Augusta (honorific), a title used for the Empresses of the Roman and Byzantine Empires
 Augusta (name), a given name and surname

Roman roads
 Via Augusta
 Via Claudia Augusta

Science
 254 Augusta, an asteroid
 Augusta family, an asteroid family
 Augusta, a monotypic spider genus in the family Araneidae with the only species Augusta glyphica
 Augusta (plant), a genus in the family Rubiaceae

Ships
 USS Augusta, U.S. Navy ships named Augusta
 HMS Augusta, Royal Navy ships named Augusta
 Princess Augusta (ship), a British ship wrecked in 1738
 Augusta (lifeboat), a lifeboat, Sheringham, Norfolk, England

Other uses
 Augusta Apartment Building, listed on the National Register of Historic Places in Washington, D.C., US
 Augustan History (Latin: Historia Augusta), a half-mockumentary biography of the Roman emperors of the 1st and 2nd century
 Augusta Heritage Festival, a festival in West Virginia, US 
 Legio II Augusta, a Roman legion
 Augusta (album), by Willie Nelson and Don Cherry
 Lancia Augusta, an automobile
 Augusta (grape), an Italian grape variety
 The Augustas, a homemade movie about towns named "Augusta"

See also
 Shire of Augusta-Margaret River, Australia
 Augusta Euphratensis ("Euphratean Augusta"), a Roman province in Syria under Diocletian
 Aust, a village in Gloucestershire, England, claimed to be derived from Augusta
 Augustus (disambiguation)
 August (disambiguation)
 Augusts (given name)
 Agusta (disambiguation)
 Port Augusta (disambiguation)